Bholaram Shibal Kharkia College, Maithon, also known as B.S.K. College, Maithon, established in 1966, is a general degree college in Maithon, Jharkhand. It offers undergraduate courses in arts, commerce and sciences. It is affiliated to Binod Bihari Mahto Koyalanchal University.

Accreditation
Bholaram Shibal Kharkia College, Maithon was accredited by the National Assessment and Accreditation Council (NAAC).

See also
Education in India
Literacy in India
List of institutions of higher education in Jharkhand

References

External links
http://bskc.in/index.php

Colleges affiliated to Binod Bihari Mahto Koyalanchal University
Universities and colleges in Jharkhand
Education in Dhanbad district
Educational institutions established in 1966